Chalicotheres (from Greek chalix, "gravel" and therion, "beast") are an extinct clade of herbivorous, odd-toed ungulate (perissodactyl) mammals that lived in North America, Eurasia, and Africa from the Middle Eocene until the Early Pleistocene, existing from 48.6 to 1.806 mya. They are one of the five major radiations of perissodactyls, with three groups living (horses, plus the extinct paleotheres; rhinoceroses; tapirs), and two extinct (brontotheres and chalicotheres).

Description

Unlike modern perissodactyls, chalicotheres had clawed feet.  They had longer forelimbs and shorter hind limbs, lower incisors that cropped food against a toothless pad in the upper jaw, low-crowned molar teeth, and were browsers on trees and shrubs throughout their history. They evolved in two different directions, which became separate subfamilies, the Schizotheriinae and the Chalicotheriinae. 

Schizotherine chalicotheres such as Moropus lived in a variety of forest, woodland, and savannah habitats in Asia, Africa, and North and Central America. They developed long necks and skull adaptations that suggest they had long, extensible tongues to reach browse, like those of giraffes. Strong hindlimbs and an elongated pelvis suggest they could have reared upright as modern goats do, and used their front claws to pull branches within reach of the tongue. The claws were retractable, and they walked normally on the bottom of the foot. Studies of tooth wear suggest they ate leaves, twigs, fruit, and bark. 

Chalicotheriines, such as Anisodon, lived only in moist, closed-canopy forests, never reached the Americas, and developed very unusual anatomy for an ungulate. Their shorter necks and horse-like heads did not show adaptations to reach high. Instead, they developed very long forelimbs with mobile shoulder joints and hooklike claws. The pelvis and hindlimbs were specialized to stand upright, and to sit for hours while feeding, like the living gelada monkey. Some early paleontologists thought the claws were used to dig up roots and tubers, but their teeth were designed for soft foods, and studies of tooth wear show they ate fruit and seeds. Their forelimbs were specialized to reach, grasp, and strip or sweep plants to the mouth. They could not retract the huge front claws, and knuckle-walked on their forelimbs. The chalicotheriines' anatomical design, posture, and locomotion show convergence with other large browsers that feed selectively in a bipedal position, such as the ground sloths, gorillas, and giant pandas.

Chalicothere fossils are uncommon even in areas where other taxa of similar size are well-preserved, which suggests they were mostly solitary animals, and unlike horses, rhinos, and brontotheres, never evolved species that lived in herds. Only two species of chalicothere are known from complete skeletons, the schizotheriine Moropus from the early Miocene of North America, and the chalicotheriine Anisodon from the middle Miocene of Europe. Fossils of other species range from very fragmentary to moderately complete. Chalicotheres ranged in size from an antelope to a large draft horse.

Evolution
Chalicotheres can be first identified with certainty around 46 million years ago, in the Eocene of Asia. The family is thought to have evolved there, but appeared in North America by the Eocene. By the late Oligocene, they had divided into schizotheriines and chalicotheriines. (Earlier chalicotheres are often referred to the family Eomoropidae; it is not yet clear whether they had claws or how the two subfamilies diverged.) Both subfamilies were successful over many millions of years, and reached their greatest diversity in the Miocene. Advanced schizotheriines (Moropus) entered North America via the Bering land bridge at the Oligicene-Miocene boundary, and expanded southward into Central America. There were multiple radiations into Africa, where chalcotheriines were later replaced by schizotheriines. Both groups spread early into Europe. In the Pliocene, they would have faced new competition in North America from megalonychid ground sloths which emigrated from South America in the Great American Interchange, and from evolving great apes in African and European forests. The family became less successful after the Miocene but persisted in Africa until the end of the Pleistocene; the latest surviving species was the schizotheriine Ancylotherium hennigi.

Chalicotheres are related to the extinct brontotheres, as well as to modern day horses, rhinoceroses, and tapirs. As the early evolution of perissodactyls is still unresolved, their closest relatives among other perissodactyl groups is obscure. They have been traditionally ranked as closer to Ceratomorpha (tapirs+rhinos) than Equoidea (horses, etc.). However, a 2004 cladistic study recovers chalicotheres as the sister group to Lophiodontidae, and the combined group (Ancylopoda) as sister to all modern perissodactyls (Equoidea+Ceratomorpha), with the brontotheres as the most distantly related within the order Perissodactyla.

References

 
Piacenzian extinctions
Clawed herbivores
Eocene first appearances
Taxa named by Theodore Gill